Simone Della Latta (born 7 March 1993) is an Italian professional footballer who plays as a midfielder for  club Carrarese.

Club career
On 12 August 2020, he joined Serie C club Padova.

On 2 August 2022, Della Latta moved to Carrarese on a three-year contract.

References

External links
 
 

1993 births
Living people
People from Viareggio
Footballers from Tuscany
Italian footballers
Association football midfielders
Serie C players
Empoli F.C. players
U.S. Gavorrano players
F.C. Esperia Viareggio players
U.S. Città di Pontedera players
U.S. Grosseto 1912 players
A.C. Carpi players
Piacenza Calcio 1919 players
Calcio Padova players
Carrarese Calcio players
Sportspeople from the Province of Lucca